John Bury (fl. 1430s – 1470s) was a Canon of Windsor from 1446 to 1472.

Career

He was appointed:
Rector of Cottesmore, Rutland until 1440
Vicar of St Giles-without-Cripplegate 1440
Precentor of St George's Chapel, Windsor Castle 1449–1450

He was appointed to the twelfth stall in St George's Chapel, Windsor Castle in 1446, and held the stall until 1472.

See also 
Catholic Church in England

Notes 

15th-century English Roman Catholic priests
Canons of Windsor
15th-century English people